Hugh Reinagle ( in Philadelphia – May 1834 near New Orleans) was an American painter.

He studied under John J. Holland, and became known as a landscape painter, working in oil and watercolor. For many years, he worked as a scene painter in New York, and produced also a panorama of New York, which was exhibited in that city. In 1830, he went to New Orleans, where he died of cholera four years later. He was one of the original thirty members of the National Academy of Design, and exhibited there, in 1831, a View of the Falls of Mount Ida. His Macdonough's Victory on Lake Champlain was engraved by Benjamin Tanner in 1816.

Notes

External links
 

1790 births
1834 deaths
19th-century American painters
19th-century American male artists
American male painters
Artists from Philadelphia